Magic: The Gathering – Puzzle Quest is a puzzle video game that combines the gem-matching concept in Puzzle Quest and its sequels, with the collectible card game aspects of Magic: The Gathering. It was released for mobile systems in December 2015.

Gameplay
Magic: The Gathering – Puzzle Quest puts the player in the role of one of several Planeswalkers that fight against a number of enemies including other Planeswalkers. The game's Magic side is based on the at-the-time current Magic Origins cardset.

At the start of the game, the player gains access to one Planeswalker and a number of cards. As they progress in the game, the player gains in-game currency that can be used to level up the Planeswalker, which increases their health and unlocks certain in-game abilities, or to spend on card packs to expand their card libraries. The game also allows for Microtransactions to purchase new card packs.  Outside of a match, the player can adjust the cards in their Planeswalker library. As in Magic, the cards are generally tied to one or more of the five Mana colors: white, blue, black, red or green. A Planeswalker is associated with one specific Mana color and can only use cards that have that Mana type.  Cards represent three major categories of spells: summon spells to bring creatures to the playfield to fight, spells that can affect creatures in various ways, and support cards that affect the board in various ways.

In a match, the player is pitted against another opponent who holds their own deck of cards and health. The player and opponent start with three random dealt cards, placed in order, in their hand. To cast a card, the players match gems through swapping of two adjacent gems on a gem board that represents the five Mana colors as well as a colorless "Loyalty" gem type that is used to enable the Planeswalker skills. Unlike traditional Magic, the mana gained from these gems is colorless and all applies to the cards in order; however, the value of each match is affected by the Planewalker and may earn bonus mana or be penalized mana for matching a given color. The matched gems are removed and new gems fall into place, and if further matches are made, these are awarded to the player making the match. An additional bonus swap is given if the player makes a match of five-in-a-row. Before making a match, the player may also activate any Planeswalker skill if they have enough Loyalty points for it. At any time before matching gems, the player can reorder the cards in their hand to be cast in a specific order or, prioritize a card.

After matches and/or activating the Planeswalker ability, if any cards have sufficient mana, they are automatically cast, save for spells that can be held until conditions are met or the player opts to let it be cast. For creatures, the players can only have 3 different creatures on the playfield at any time. The Casting of a new creature will require the player to select one of the existing creatures to remove. Alternately, casting the same type of creature that already is on the playfield will "add" the power and defense of the new creature to the existing one. As with Magic, creatures generally suffer "summoning sickness" and cannot attack the turn they come into play.

Once a player's spells are cast, combat is resolved automatically. Creatures by default will automatically attack the opposing player, damaging that player with their current attack value. Certain effects will alter this attacking behavior. For example, creatures may be "defenders", which will automatically force opponent creatures to attack it before the player. When creatures are attacked, they take damage from their defense value. Unlike Magic, this damage stays permanent until the value drops to zero or below at which point the creature is destroyed. Once the damage is resolved, the opposing player then goes.

Once either the player or opponent's health drops to zero, the match is over. The player is awarded in-game currency, regardless of a win or loss, though the value is much higher for victories. The player can also receive extra rewards for completing matches with specific conditions, such as winning in a small number of rounds. Any damage taken by the Planeswalker character will take some amount of real-time to regenerate, such that a player cannot immediately challenge an opponent after a defeat, though the player can use a healing potion, which replenishes over time, to fully heal the character, or can switch to a different Planeswalker to use.

Game currency
Magic: the Gathering – Puzzle Quest has three forms of in-game currency:  Mana Runes,  Mana Jewels  and Mana Crystals.

Mana Runes
Mana Runes are the standard currency in the game. They are used to level up your Planeswalkers. Players are rewarded runes for completing Story and Quick Battle duels. Players can also receive runes by collecting Daily Rewards.

In Story mode, players receive a larger amount of runes for winning a duel the first time, increasing in amount as you progress through story mode; subsequent wins award 100 runes. Players also receive 50 runes for a loss in Story mode.

In Quick Battle mode, players receive 300 runes for a win, and potentially more for defeating opponents of a high level.

Mana Crystals
Mana Crystals are the premium in-game currency. They are used to buy new Planeswalkers and Booster Packs.

Players are rewarded Mana Crystals for completing secondary objectives in story mode. Players can also receive crystals by collecting Daily Rewards.

As in most Free to Play games with premium currency, players may purchase Mana Crystals at the following rates (prices in USD):

 100 Mana Crystals for $4.99 
 220 Mana Crystals for $9.99
 500 Mana Crystals for $19.99
 1300 Mana Crystals for $49.99
 3000 Mana Crystals for $99.99

prices may vary depending on special sales and VIP status if paying for a monthly subscription.***

Mana Jewels
Mana Jewels are used to purchase the Elite Pack, which offers a single card. This pack guarantees a Mythic, and has a chance of a Masterpiece card. Every 2 weeks, a new selection of Mythic and Masterpiece cards will be available through the Elite Pack in the Vault. The current rotation of cards can be viewed by clicking the "View Cards" info button. A single Elite Pack costs 400 Mana Jewels.

Daily rewards
Magic: the Gathering – Puzzle Quest has a daily rewards system that rewards players with game currency or booster packs for logging in each day.  

The rewards follow a 30 day pattern of progressively greater rewards over a calendar month:

Runes > Gold > Crystals > Runes > Booster Pack

A player that collects 21 rewards on a specific calendar month will also get a special card in addition to the 21st daily reward.

The rewards are based on the calendar month and will reset back to Day 1 at the start of each month.

References
Kotaku

2015 video games
Android (operating system) games
D3 Publisher games
IOS games
Magic: The Gathering software
Puzzle video games
Video games developed in Canada
Single-player video games
Puzzle Quest